Cusi may refer to:

People
 Alfonso Cusi (born 1949), Filipino businessman
 Allan Ferdinand V. Cusi, Filipino admiral
 Bruna Cusí (born 1986), Spanish actress
 Cusi Cram (born 1967), American playwright
 Cusi Huarcay
 Cusi Yupanqui or Pachacuti
 José Cusí (born 1934), Spanish sports shooter
 Rafael Arenillo Cusi, Filipino artist
 Titu Cusi (1529–1571), Inca ruler

Places
 , Croatia
 , Croatia
 Cusi Cusi, Argentina

Other
 Centro Universitario Sportivo Italiano